The huge moth family Noctuidae contains the following genera:

A B C D E F G H I J K L M N O P Q R S T U V W X Y Z

Yepcalphis
Yerongponga
Yidalpta
Yigoga
Ypsia
Ypsora
Yrias
Yula

References 

 Natural History Museum Lepidoptera genus database

 
Noctuid genera Y